Gloucester Transport Hub (also known as Gloucester bus station) is a bus station on Station Road in Gloucester, England.

History

 
Until 1933, the main type of public transport in Gloucester was the tram. In 1935, after the closure of the tramlines. Gloucester City Council partnered with the Bristol Omnibus Company leasing out its bus services. At this point in time there was no bus station in the city. However, the old tram depot on London Road was enlarged and used as a bus depot and is today used by Stagecoach West. 
The original bus station, which had 11 bays, opened in 1962 on the former cattle market site which is now part of Kings Square. This greatly increased the popularity of the shopping area around Northgate Street and Eastgate Street. Also at this time, a new inner ring road through the city was built, with the first part being Bruton Way which runs east of the bus station.

In 2012, Gloucester City Council agreed to a deal with Stanhope to revamp the Kings Quarter area. This project was planned to cost £60 million with GFirst LEP providing a budget of £3 million to build a new transport hub to replace the old bus station. At this time, an eight week archaeological project took place to investigate the area around the bus station before any major development work was undertaken. A Roman flood bank was found under the station from this project. In May and June 2016, the old bus station was demolished in preparation for the new one which now had a budget of £7.5 million with £6.4 million of that coming from the government through GFirst LEP. Part of Grosvenor House was also demolished and several businesses including the Furniture Recycling Project had to leave the site.

The original plans for the new transport hub included having a glass front to the northwest side. However, in July 2017 the city council submitted a planning application for a smaller building than originally designed with the northwest side being external render instead of glass. Additionally, the plans to demolish Bentinck House were put on hold. The proposed reason for these changes was due to a sewer being in an unexpected place and to provide greater flexibility for future development. Along with the building plans changes to the road layout around Station Road and Bruton Way were made to make the new transport hub more accessible.

Construction of the new transport hub was started in August 2017 and carried out by Kier Construction, and it opened to the public on 27 October 2018. It has 12 bus bays, a staffed ticket office, electronic timetable displays, a cafe and toilets. It also has solar panels to power the internal lighting and features a stained glass window designed by Thomas Denny costing £100,000.

As of November 2019, the stained glass window has not been installed and Thomas Denny is no longer involved with the project.

Facilities 
The bus station was built with a shop and cafe. By 2023, these were both vacant.

References

Buildings and structures in Gloucester
Transport in Gloucester
Bus stations in Gloucestershire
Transport infrastructure completed in 1962
1962 establishments in England
2017 disestablishments in England
Transport infrastructure completed in 2018
2018 establishments in England